Nevidzany is a village and municipality in Prievidza District in the Trenčín Region of western Slovakia.

History
In historical records the village was first mentioned in 1229.

Geography
The municipality lies at an altitude of 411 metres and covers an area of 11.785 km². It has a population of about 295 people.

References

External links
 
 
http://www.statistics.sk/mosmis/eng/run.html

Villages and municipalities in Prievidza District